HIP 5158 c is an extrasolar planet, orbiting the 10th magnitude K-type main sequence star HIP 5158 about 135 lightyears away from Earth, in the constellation Cetus.

It orbits its primary star at an average distance (semi-major axis) of 7.7 AU. The actual orbital period is unknown, but is estimated to be somewhere in between 9,018 and 12,200 days. It travels with an eccentricity of 0.14. It also has an estimated minimal mass 15.04 . It was discovered by HARPS on October 19, 2009, together with 29 other planets, and confirmed in May 2011.

Being heavier than 13 , the HIP 5158 c can be classified either as brown dwarf or as superjovian planet.

References 

20091019
Cetus (constellation)